"Waterloo" is the first single from the Swedish pop group ABBA's second album of the same name, and their first under the Atlantic label in the US. This was also the first single to be credited to the group performing under the name ABBA. The title and lyrics reference the 1815 Battle of Waterloo, and use it as a metaphor for a romantic relationship. The Swedish version of the single was backed with the Swedish version of "Honey, Honey", while the English version featured "Watch Out" on the B-side.

"Waterloo" won the Eurovision Song Contest 1974 for Sweden, beginning ABBA's path to worldwide fame. It topped the charts in several countries, and reached the top 10 in the United States.

At the 50th anniversary celebration of the Eurovision Song Contest in 2005, it was chosen as the best song in the competition's history. It received the same honour in a 14-country open vote in the run-up to the Eurovision Song Contest 2021, placing first above Sweden's winning songs in 2012 and 2015, Loreen's "Euphoria" and Måns Zelmerlöw's "Heroes", respectively.

Writing, recording and meaning
"Waterloo" was written specifically to be entered into the 1974 Eurovision Song Contest, after the group finished third with "Ring Ring" the previous year in the Swedish pre-selection contest, Melodifestivalen 1973.

The original title of the song was "Honey Pie". "Waterloo" was originally written with simultaneous rock music and jazz beats (unusual for an ABBA song).

Recording of the song commenced on 17 December 1973, with instrumental backing from Janne Schaffer (who came up with the main guitar and bass parts), Rutger Gunnarsson and Ola Brunkert. The song's production style was influenced by Phil Spector's "Wall of Sound": prior to recording "Ring Ring", engineer Michael B. Tretow had read Richard Williams' book Out of His Head: The Sound of Phil Spector, which inspired him to layer multiple instrumental overdubs on the band's recordings, becoming an integral part of ABBA's sound. Furthermore, ABBA had also originally cited the song "See My Baby Jive", by English glam rock band Wizzard, as a major influence (it was produced in the same style); in the wake of their Eurovision victory, they were quoted as saying that it would not surprise them if artists such as Wizzard would consider entering the Eurovision in the future.

Subsequently, German and French versions were recorded in March and April 1974 respectively: the French version was adapted by Alain Boublil, who would later go on to co-write the 1980 musical Les Misérables.

The song's lyrics are metaphorical and are about a woman who "surrenders" to a man and promises to love him, likening it to Napoleon's defeat at the Battle of Waterloo in 1815.

At Eurovision
The band considered submitting another song to Eurovision, "Hasta Mañana", but decided on "Waterloo" since it gave equal weight to both lead vocalists Agnetha Fältskog and Anni-Frid Lyngstad, while "Hasta Mañana" was sung only by Fältskog.

ABBA performed the song at Melodifestivalen 1974 in February, singing it in Swedish. The song won, and therefore advanced to Eurovision.

The song differed from the standard "dramatic ballad" tradition of the Eurovision Song Contest by its flavour and rhythm, as well as by its performance. ABBA gave the audience something that had rarely been seen before in Eurovision: flashy costumes (including silver platform boots), plus a catchy uptempo song and even simple choreography. Compared to later ABBA releases, the singers' Swedish accents are decidedly more pronounced in "Waterloo".

The song scored 24 points to win the Eurovision Song Contest 1974 final on 6 April, beating runner-up Gigliola Cinquetti of 's entry "Sì" by six points.

Reception
The song shot to No. 1 in the UK and stayed there for two weeks, becoming the first of the band's nine UK No. 1's, and the 16th biggest selling single of the year in the UK.
It also topped the charts in Belgium, Denmark, Finland, West Germany, Ireland, Norway, South Africa, and Switzerland, while reaching the Top 3 in Austria, France, the Netherlands, Spain, and ABBA's native Sweden. (The song was immensely popular in Sweden, but did not reach No. 1 there due to Sweden having a combined Album and Singles Chart at the time: at the peak of the song's popularity, its Swedish and English versions reached No. 2 and No. 3, respectively, while the No. 1 spot was held by the album Waterloo.) The song also spent 11 weeks on Svensktoppen (24 March – 2 June 1974), including 7 weeks at No. 1.

As of September 2021, it is ABBA's eleventh-biggest song in the UK, including both pure sales and digital streams.

Unlike other Eurovision-winning tunes, the song's appeal transcended Europe: "Waterloo" also reached the Top 10 in Australia, Canada, New Zealand, Rhodesia, and the United States (peaking at No. 6, their third highest-charting U.S. hit after No. 1 "Dancing Queen" and No. 3 "Take a Chance on Me"). The Waterloo album performed similarly well in Europe, although in the US it failed to match the success of the single.

Cash Box said that this "is not a brash rocker, it's just solid rock with a very competent lady up front." Record World said that "Napoleon's downfall shall be this act's victory."

Legacy
"Waterloo" was re-released in 2004 (with the same B-side), to celebrate the 30th anniversary of ABBA's Eurovision win, reaching No. 20 on the UK charts.

On 22 October 2005, at the 50th anniversary celebration of the Eurovision Song Contest, "Waterloo" was chosen as the best song in the competition's history.

Harry Witchel, physiologist and music expert at the University of Bristol, named "Waterloo" the quintessential Eurovision song.

In 2017, Billboard ranked the song number 9 on their list of the 15 greatest ABBA songs, and in 2021, Rolling Stone ranked the song number 10 on their list of the 25 greatest ABBA songs.

Track listing

Swedish version
a. "Waterloo" (Swedish version) – 2:45 b. "Honey Honey" (Swedish version) – 2:55

English version
a. "Waterloo" (English version) – 2:46b. "Watch Out" – 3:46

Official versions 

 "Waterloo" (English version)
 "Waterloo" (English alternate version)
 "Waterloo" (French version) – recorded 18 April 1974 in Paris, France
 "Waterloo" (French/Swedish version) – overdubs of French and Swedish versions
 "Waterloo" (German version)
 "Waterloo" (Swedish version)

Charts

Weekly charts

Year-end charts

Certifications and sales

Release history

Mamma Mia! Here We Go Again version
"Waterloo" was released on 1 June 2018 as the second single from the Mamma Mia! Here We Go Again soundtrack, by Capitol and Polydor Records. The song is performed by Hugh Skinner (Young Harry) and Lily James (Young Donna) and was produced by Benny Andersson.

Charts

Certifications

Other cover versions

 In 1986, Doctor and the Medics covered the song, reaching number 45 in the UK charts; Roy Wood performed saxophone.
 In 2018, Cher covered the song on her ABBA covers album Dancing Queen. During her Here We Go Again Tour she performed "Waterloo" together with "SOS" and "Fernando". On 31 October 2018 "The Shoop Shoop Song (It's in His Kiss)" and "Take Me Home" were cut from her Classic Cher concert residency and "Waterloo", "SOS" and "Fernando" were added. On 18 September 2019 Cher also performed "Waterloo" at the season 14 finale of America's Got Talent, to promote the album and her Here We Go Again Tour.

Live cover performances
 The song is featured in the encore of the musical Mamma Mia!. The song does not have a context or a meaning. It is just performed as a musical number in which members of the audience are encouraged to get up off their seats and sing, dance and clap along.
 The song is performed by the cast over the closing credits of the film Mamma Mia!, but is not featured on the official soundtrack.
 The song is also performed in the sequel, Mamma Mia! Here We Go Again, by Hugh Skinner and Lily James.

Appearances in other media
 ABBA perform parts of the song live in the 1977 film ABBA: The Movie.
 The Australian film Muriel's Wedding (1994), features "Waterloo" in a pivotal scene in which lead Toni Collette bonds with the character played by Rachel Griffiths. The film's soundtrack, featuring five ABBA tracks, is widely regarded as having helped to fuel the revival of popular interest in ABBA's music in the mid-1990s.
 "Waterloo" features prominently in the 2015 science-fiction film The Martian. The song plays as the film's lead, played by Matt Damon, works to ready his launch vehicle for a last-chance escape from Mars.
 "Here I Go Again", the 11th episode of the third season of Legends of Tomorrow (19 February 2018), begins in medias res, with the titular time-traveling team having apparently just restored a time-transplanted Napoleon from the 1970s, where he had come into possession of a copy of the record. The song is also stuck in the head of one member of the team, until he erases his own memory to get it out.
 In "Mother Simpson", the eighth episode of the seventh season of The Simpsons, Mr. Burns plays "Ride of the Valkyries" from a tank about to storm the Simpson home, but the song is cut-off and "Waterloo" is played, to which Smithers apologizes, advising he "must have accidentally taped over that".

References

External links
 Classic pop video of Waterloo
 Abba4therecord.com
 

ABBA songs
1974 singles
Atlantic Records singles
Epic Records singles
Eurovision songs of 1974
Eurovision songs of Sweden
Congratulations Eurovision songs
Melodifestivalen songs of 1974
UK Singles Chart number-one singles
Number-one singles in Germany
Irish Singles Chart number-one singles
Number-one singles in Norway
Number-one singles in South Africa
Number-one singles in Switzerland
Songs written by Benny Andersson and Björn Ulvaeus
Eurovision Song Contest winning songs
Swedish-language songs
Polar Music singles
Polydor Records singles
Music videos directed by Lasse Hallström
1974 songs
Songs about Napoleon
Songs about Belgium
Song recordings with Wall of Sound arrangements